In geometry, the small stellated 120-cell or stellated polydodecahedron is a regular star 4-polytope with Schläfli symbol {5/2,5,3}. It is one of 10 regular Schläfli-Hess polytopes.

Related polytopes 

It has the same edge arrangement as the great grand 120-cell, and also shares its 120 vertices with the 600-cell and eight other regular star 4-polytopes. It may also be seen as the first stellation of the 120-cell. In this sense it could be seen as analogous to the three-dimensional small stellated dodecahedron, which is the first stellation of the dodecahedron. Indeed, the small stellated 120-cell is dual to the icosahedral 120-cell, which could be taken as a 4D analogue of the great dodecahedron, dual of the small stellated dodecahedron.

The edges of the small stellated 120-cell are τ2 as long as those of the 120-cell core inside the 4-polytope.

See also 
 List of regular polytopes
 Convex regular 4-polytope - Set of convex regular 4-polytope
 Kepler-Poinsot solids - regular star polyhedron
 Star polygon - regular star polygons

References 
 Edmund Hess, (1883) Einleitung in die Lehre von der Kugelteilung mit besonderer Berücksichtigung ihrer Anwendung auf die Theorie der Gleichflächigen und der gleicheckigen Polyeder .
H. S. M. Coxeter, Regular Polytopes, 3rd. ed., Dover Publications, 1973. .
 John H. Conway, Heidi Burgiel, Chaim Goodman-Strass, The Symmetries of Things 2008,  (Chapter 26, Regular Star-polytopes, pp. 404–408)

External links 
 Regular polychora
 Discussion on names
 Reguläre Polytope
 The Regular Star Polychora
 Zome Model of the Final Stellation of the 120-cell
 The First Stellation of the 120-cell, A Zome Model

4-polytopes